Mandeville School may refer to:

Mandeville High School, Mandeville, Louisiana
Mandeville School, Aylesbury, England
Mandeville JMI, Sawbridgeworth, England
Mandeville Secondary School, Edmonton, England, now known as AIM North London Academy

See also 
Mandeville (disambiguation)